Software development is the process of conceiving, specifying, designing, programming, documenting, testing, and bug fixing involved in creating and maintaining applications, frameworks, or other software components. Software development involves writing and maintaining the source code, but in a broader sense, it includes all processes from the conception of the desired software through to the final manifestation of the software, typically in a planned and structured process. Software development also includes research, new development, prototyping, modification, reuse, re-engineering, maintenance, or any other activities that result in software products.

Methodologies
One system development methodology is not necessarily suitable for use by all projects.

Each of the available methodologies are best suited to specific kinds of projects, based on various technical, organizational, project, and team considerations.

Software development activities

Identification of need
The sources of ideas for software products are plentiful. These ideas can come from market research including the demographics of potential new customers, existing customers, sales prospects who rejected the product, other internal software development staff, or a creative third party. Ideas for software products are usually first evaluated by marketing personnel for economic feasibility, for fit with existing channels distribution, for possible effects on existing product lines, required features, and for fit with the company's marketing objectives. In a marketing evaluation phase, the cost and time assumptions become evaluated. A decision is reached early in the first phase as to whether, based on the more detailed information generated by the marketing and development staff, the project should be pursued further.

In the book "Great Software Debates", Alan M. Davis states in the chapter "Requirements", sub-chapter "The Missing Piece of Software Development"
Students of engineering learn engineering and are rarely exposed to finance or marketing. Students of marketing learn marketing and are rarely exposed to finance or engineering. Most of us become specialists in just one area. To complicate matters, few of us meet interdisciplinary people in the workforce, so there are few roles to mimic. Yet, software product planning is critical to the development success and absolutely requires knowledge of multiple disciplines.

Planning process
An important task in creating software is requirements analysis. Customers typically have an abstract idea of what they want as an end result but do not know what software should do. Skilled and experienced software engineers recognize incomplete, ambiguous, or even contradictory requirements at this point.  Frequently demonstrating live code may help reduce the risk that the requirements are incorrect.

"Although much effort is put in the requirements phase to ensure that requirements are complete and consistent, rarely that is the case; leaving the software design phase as the most influential one when it comes to minimizing the effects of new or changing requirements. Requirements volatility is challenging because they impact future or already going development efforts."

Software developer

A software developer is a person or company engaged in a software development process, including research, design, programming, testing, and other facets of creating computer software. Other job titles for individuals with similar meanings include programmer, software analyst, or software engineer. Companies specializing in software may be called software houses. In a large company, there may be employees whose sole responsibility consists of only one of the disciplines. In smaller development environments, a few people or even a single individual might handle the complete process. Collaborative environments, such as open-source software, can bring together many developers.

Subtopics

View model

A view model is a framework that provides the viewpoints on the system and its environment, to be used in the software development process. It is a graphical representation of the underlying semantics of a view.

The purpose of viewpoints and views is to enable human engineers to comprehend very complex systems and to organize the elements of the problem around domains of expertise. In the engineering of physically intensive systems, viewpoints often correspond to capabilities and responsibilities within the engineering organization.

Business process and data modelling
Graphical representation of the current state of information provides a very effective means for presenting information to both users and system developers.

 A business model illustrates the functions associated with the business process being modeled and the organizations that perform these functions. By depicting activities and information flows, a foundation is created to visualize, define, understand, and validate the nature of a process.
 A data model provides the details of information to be stored and is of primary use when the final product is the generation of computer software code for an application or the preparation of a functional specification to aid a computer software make-or-buy decision. See the figure on the right for an example of the interaction between business process and data models.

Usually, a model is created after conducting an interview, referred to as business analysis. The interview consists of a facilitator asking a series of questions designed to extract required information that describes a process. The interviewer is called a facilitator to emphasize that it is the participants who provide the information. The facilitator should have some knowledge of the process of interest, but this is not as important as having a structured methodology by which the questions are asked of the process expert. The methodology is
important because usually a team of facilitators is collecting information across the facility and the results of the information from all the interviewers must fit together once completed.

The models are developed as defining either the current state of the process, in which case the final product is called the "as-is" snapshot model, or a collection of ideas of what the process should contain, resulting in a "what-can-be" model. Generation of process and data models can be used to determine if the existing processes and information systems are sound and only need minor modifications or enhancements, or if re-engineering is required as a corrective action. The creation of business models is more than a way to view or automate your information process. Analysis can be used to fundamentally reshape the way your business or organization conducts its operations.

Computer-aided software engineering
Computer-aided software engineering (CASE), in the field software engineering, is the scientific application of a set of software tools and methods to the development of software which results in high-quality, defect-free, and maintainable software products. It also refers to methods for the development of information systems together with automated tools that can be used in the software development process. The term "computer-aided software engineering" (CASE) can refer to the software used for the automated development of systems software, i.e., computer code. The CASE functions include analysis, design, and programming. CASE tools automate methods for designing, documenting, and producing structured computer code in the desired programming language.

Two key ideas of Computer-aided Software System Engineering (CASE) are:
 Foster computer assistance in software development and software maintenance processes, and
 An engineering approach to software development and maintenance.

Typical CASE tools exist for configuration management, data modeling, model transformation, refactoring, source code generation.

Modeling language
A modeling language is any artificial language that can be used to express information or knowledge or systems in a structure that is defined by a consistent set of rules. The rules are used for interpretation of the meaning of components in the structure. A modeling language can be graphical or textual.

Programming paradigm
A programming paradigm is a fundamental style of computer programming, which is not generally dictated by the project management methodology (such as waterfall or agile). Paradigms differ in the concepts and abstractions used to represent the elements of a program (such as objects, functions, variables, constraints) and the steps that comprise a computation (such as assignations, evaluation, continuations, data flows).  Sometimes the concepts asserted by the paradigm are utilized cooperatively in high-level system architecture design; in other cases, the programming paradigm's scope is limited to the internal structure of a particular program or module. Example: Grady Booch's object-oriented design (OOD), also known as object-oriented analysis and design (OOAD). The Booch model includes six diagrams: class, object, state transition, interaction, module, and process.

See also
Continuous integration
Custom software 
Functional specification
Programming productivity
Software blueprint
Software design
Systems design  
Software development effort estimation
Software development process
Software industry
Software project management
Specification and Description Language
User experience
Video game development 
Web development

Roles and industry
Computer programmer
Consulting software engineer
Offshore software development
Software developer
Software engineer
Software publisher

References

Further reading
 
 
 
 
 
 
 
 John W. Horch (2005). "Two Orientations On How To Work With Objects." In: IEEE Software. vol. 12, no. 2, pp. 117–118, Mar., 1995.

External links

 

 
Development
Computer occupations
Product development

sq:Zhvillimi i softuerit